The 1932 Fresno State Bulldogs football team represented Fresno State Normal School during the 1932 college football season.

Fresno State competed in the Far Western Conference (FWC). The 1932 team was led by fourth-year head coach Stanley Borleske and played home games at Fresno State College Stadium on the campus of Fresno City College in Fresno, California. They finished the season with a record of three wins, five losses and two ties (3–5–2, 0–3–1 FWC). The Bulldogs were outscored by their opponents 56–91 for the season, and were shut out in six of their ten games.

Schedule

Notes

References

Fresno State
Fresno State Bulldogs football seasons
Fresno State Bulldogs football